I Take This Oath is a 1940 American crime drama film directed by Sam Newfield under the pseudonym of Sherman Scott. Featuring Gordon Jones and Joyce Compton, it was the first release by Producers Releasing Corporation. In 1952, Pictorial Films reissued it for television showings as Police Rookie.

Plot
Police officer Mike Hanagan (Robert Homans) attempts to expose a fraudulent official who works with a gang of racketeers, but the official has Hanagan murdered. Hanagan's son Steve (Gordon Jones) decides to avenge his father, and at the suggestion of his girlfriend Betty Casey (Joyce Compton) he joins the police force.

Under the instruction of Daniel Casey (Guy Usher), Betty's father, Steve begins learning how to be an officer. However, as he has become so dedicated to finding his father's murderer, he begins to fall behind on his law studies, and due to his poor grades he is dismissed from the force. Steve believes he has found the clue that points to his friend Joe Kelly's (Craig Reynolds) uncle Jim Kelly (Sam Flint) being the murderer.

When Jim hears that Steve suspects him, he decides that Steve must be killed. A struggle ensues between Steve and Jim, and a bullet is fired at Steve but Joe is hit instead and Steve then shoots Jim. Impressed, Casey returns to allow Steve back onto the police force.

Cast
Gordon Jones as Steve Hanagan
Joyce Compton as Betty Casey
Craig Reynolds as Joe Kelly
J. Farrell MacDonald as Insp. Tim Ryan
Veda Ann Borg as Flo
Mary Gordon as Mrs. Eileen Hanagan
Robert Homans as Mike Hanagan
Sam Flint as Uncle Jim Kelly
Guy Usher as Capt. Casey
Brooks Benedict as Burly
Edward Peil, Sr. as Sgt. Riley
Budd Buster as Jones

External links

1940 films
American black-and-white films
1940 crime drama films
Films directed by Sam Newfield
Producers Releasing Corporation films
American crime drama films
1940s English-language films
1940s American films